The 2013–14 Bengaluru FC season was the club's inaugural season in I-League, the top flight of Indian football, and the first season in the club's entire history.

Bengaluru FC's season began in September 2013 with a game against Mohun Bagan. On 21 April 2014, Bengaluru FC won their first ever I-League title by defeating Dempo 2–4 at Fatorda Stadium, with one game remaining. Bengaluru FC created the history by being in the first team to win I-League title in its debut season. Sunil Chhetri was the joint top-scorer in the league with 14 goals.

In domestic cups, Bengaluru FC competed in the Federation Cup, but could not advance beyond the group stage.

Background
On 15 May 2013 it was announced that the All India Football Federation had officially received three bids for two direct-entry spots into the I-League. The bids came from the JSW Group, Dodsal Group, and a consortium from Kerala.

Finally, on 28 May 2013, it was officially announced that JSW Group had won the franchise rights to the direct-club in Bangalore and that it would be spearheaded by the companies sports branch, JSW Sports. The team would play all home games in Bangalore while setting up a youth academy there. They would also try to make better football infrastructure for the city. Then on 21 July 2013, almost two months after winning the bid for a team, JSW launched the team officially as Bengaluru Football Club by throwing a mega-electric event at the Bangalore Football Stadium, which would be announced as the home for Bengaluru FC during the season. Along with the club name and stadium, the club crest and colours were also unveiled as well as the team's home kit for the season and the squad.

Pre–season

Signings
In preparation for their first season Bengaluru started to make flurry of signings which included midfielder Thoi Singh, goalkeeper Bruno Colaço, and midfielders Keegan Pereira, Gurtej Singh, and local player Shankar Sampingiraj. Then on 2 July 2013 it was announced that Bengaluru had signed their first ever head coach in former Manchester United youth player and former Blackburn Rovers assistant manager Ashley Westwood.

On 16 July 2013 it was announced that Bengaluru had signed their first two foreigners in their history when they signed former Premier League and Middlesbrough defender John Johnson and former Football League Two and AFC Wimbledon defender Curtis Osano for the season. The club then continued their signing spree when they signed former Liberia captain and former USL First Division midfielder Johnny Menyongar. The club then signed completed a double swoop when they signed current India international forwards Robin Singh and current national captain Sunil Chhetri for the season.

Then, once the club was officially launched, the following players were unveiled by the club: goalkeepers Pawan Kumar and Ricardo Cardozo, defenders Vishal Kumar, Lalrozama Fanai, Rino Anto, and Don Bosco Andrew, midfielders Malemngamba Meetei, Darren Caldeira, and Sampath Kuttymani, and forward Karan Sawhney. The next month, in August, Bengaluru confirmed their fourth and final foreign signing of the pre–season when they signed Australian and former A-League forward Sean Rooney.

On 12 September 2013 it was announced that Bengaluru FC had added two more players to their squad in midfielders Niroshan Mani and Amoes. Both players are local players from Karnataka. Then, right before the season began, it was confirmed that the club had signed on former India international Nanjangud Shivananju Manju, as well as Beikhokhei Beingaichho and Manpreet Singh for the season.

In season signings
On 13 December 2013 it was announced that Bengaluru FC would bring in three players on loan from IMG-Reliance for the rest of the season. The players were Soram Anganba, Randhan Meitei, and Shankar Sampingiraj. Then, on 30 January 2014, it was confirmed that Bengaluru FC had signed C.K. Vineeth from fellow I-League side United S.C. on a deal that would last the remainder of the season.

Matches
The club then played their first friendly of the season against the India national football team on 25 August 2013 in their preparation for the 2013 SAFF Championship in which Bengaluru drew the match 1–1 with Johnny Menyongar scoring the first goal of the match before India equalized through Lenny Rodrigues. The club then played their second match of pre–season against MEG Bangalore at the Bangalore Football Stadium on 31 August 2013 in which Bengaluru FC won the match 8–2 with former India international Nanjangud Shivananju Manju being a part of the scoring for Bengaluru FC.

Results

Competitions

Overall

Last Updated: 28 April 2014
Source : Competitions

Overview

I-League

Summary

Bengaluru played their first ever official match in the I-League on 22 September 2013 against Mohun Bagan A.C. at the Bangalore Football Stadium. After a scoreless first-half Bengaluru scored their first ever official goal in the 49th minute to take the lead through Sean Rooney. However, in injury-time, Mohun Bagan managed to draw a goal back through Chinadorai Sabeeth and thus the match ended in a 1–1 stalemate. The club then won their first ever match in the I-League in their very next match against Rangdajied United F.C. at the Bangalore Football Stadium on 29 September 2013 in which goals from John Johnson, Sean Rooney, and Sunil Chhetri saw the team win the match 3–0 in front of their home fans.

The club then entered the month of October with their second victory in a row against United S.C. on 6 October 2013 at the Bangalore Football Stadium in which an early 4th-minute goal from John Johnson saw Bengaluru come out as the 1–0 winners. Then only four days later, the club won its third game in a row against Mohammedan S.C. at the Bangalore Football Stadium in which goals from John Johnson and Sean Rooney were enough to secure a 2–1 victory. The streak was then extended to four games on 23 October when Bengaluru FC won 3–1 over Dempo S.C. at the Bangalore Football Stadium in which goals from Siam Hanghal and Sean Rooney were enough for Bengaluru to finish off their five-game home-stand end in style. However, that is where the streak would end as Bengaluru lost their next match, which also happened to be their first away match of the season, against East Bengal F.C. at the Kalyani Stadium in Kalyani, West Bengal in which an own goal by Robin Singh and a goal from James Moga led to the loss.

The club then opened the month of November with their second away match of the season against Mumbai F.C. at the Balewadi Sports Complex in Pune, Maharashtra on 2 November 2013. The match ended in a 2–2 draw for Bengaluru with Sean Rooney and Sunil Chhetri scoring for Bengaluru and Hashmatullah Barakzai and Climax Lawrence scoring for Mumbai. Four days later, the club played their second match at the Balewadi Sports Complex but this time against Pune. The match ended 1–0 to Pune with James Meyer scoring for the hosts. Then, after a two-week international break, Bengaluru FC returned home to face Sporting Goa on 23 November. Despote holding the majority of possession Bengaluru FC succumbed to a 0–0 draw. Then in the final match of the month, Bengaluru FC went back on the road to face Salgaocar F.C. at the Duler Stadium in a top of the table battle. A goal each from Johnny Menyongar and Beikhokhei Beingaichho helped Bengaluru FC earn a 2–1 victory which not only was their first victory away from home this season but also their first away victory ever. The win also took the club to 2nd in the table on goal-difference.

The month of the December started early for Bengaluru FC as the club took on Shillong Lajong on 1 December 2013 at the Bangalore Football Stadium. Bengaluru FC eventually came out as the victors in the match after two early goals from captain Sunil Chhetri in the 7th and 34th minute (from a penalty) sealed a 2–1 win for the team. The victory pushed Bengaluru FC to the top of the I-League table to begin the month. Their second match of the month came away from home at the Duler Stadium. Bengaluru FC took on the reigning champions from last season, Churchill Brothers. Bengaluru FC took an early second half lead of 2–0 thanks to strikes from Sean Rooney and Sunil Chhetri. Churchill Brothers brought a goal back with a strike from Balwant Singh before Chhetri sealed the match for Bengaluru FC by scoring his second goal of the match as Bengaluru FC won 3–1. The team then continued their away form in Kolkata on 11 December 2013 when they defeated Mohammedan at the Salt Lake Stadium by a score of 3–2. After taking an early 21st-minute lead through Johnny Menyongar it was Josimar who scored the equalizer for Mohammedan in first-half stoppage time. Sunil Chhetri then restored the lead for Bengaluru FC in the 48th minute before Josimar once again equalized for Mohammedan in the 57th minute but in the 71st minute it was Sunil Chhetri who scored his second goal of the match and the eventual winner for the Bangalore side. However, the club then slipped to their third loss of the season in their next match against East Bengal - thus their second loss to East Bengal this season - at the Bangalore Football Stadium on 15 December 2013. Both goals for East Bengal were scored by James Moga and Chidi Edeh. It was in this match that Bengaluru FC managed to draw 8,216 fans into the Bangalore Football Stadium, the most the team has had till that point. Despite the loss though, Bengaluru FC still managed to end the month of December and the year 2013 with a victory on 21 December 2013 against Salgaocar at the Bangalore Football Stadium in which penalty goals from Sunil Chhetri and Robin Singh (his first of the season) sealed a 2–1 win for the team.

Bengaluru FC resumed their campaign in the second phase by playing Mumbai at home. Having received four yellow cards in the season, the captain Sunil Chhetri was suspended in the game and Rino Anto led the team. After goalless first half, Bengaluru were trailing 0–1 after Ebi Sukore scored for Mumbai in 47th minute. Robin Singh equalized in 55th minute and salvaged draw for Bengaluru. In round 19, the battle between top and bottom of the table, Bengaluru FC played away game against Rangdajied United F.C. After trailing 0–2 in the first half, Bengaluru equalized at 2–2 after quick goals by Chhetri and Rooney in 60th and 61st minutes, but after Ranti Martins' goal in 76th minutes, the match ended as a loss for Bengaluru. Bengaluru FC returned to form in the penultimate home game, when they defeated defending champions Churchill Brothers 3–0, courtesy three second half goals, two by Sunil Chhetri and one by Robin Singh. Bengaluru FC opened up 7 points lead at the top of table when they defeated United S.C. 1–3 in the away game. In the next game, Bengaluru FC could not score a goal and ended up losing 3–0 to Shillong Lajong. Two Bengaluru players Pawan Kumar and Curtis Osano were handed red cards in closing minutes and as a result, would miss the next game. In the last home game, Bengaluru FC played another title contender Pune FC. Bengaluru FC took the lead in 25th minute by a goal from Thoi Singh, but Pune FC equalized in the second half in 73rd minute and the game ended in 1–1. This match broke the highest attendance record at Bangalore Football Stadium with 8,347 people attending the game. With other title contenders, Salgaocar and East Bengal closing-in, Bengaluru FC desperately needed a comfortable margin at the top. In their next away game against Mohun Bagan, Thoi Singh and Sean Rooney scored a goal each in each half and secured 0–2 victory and 4 points lead at the top of the table. During the game, coach Ashley Westwood was sent off from the technical area for showing continuous dissent. With East Bengal closing in on Bengaluru FC, the team needed a win in the game against Dempo in the next game to ensure the title. Bengaluru FC lead 0–1 at the end of the first half as Sean Rooney scored early in the 2nd minute. They consolidated their lead as Robin Singh and Johnny Menyongar scored a goal each. Dempo threatened with two quick goals in the closing minutes, but Sunil Chhetri's goal, 4 minutes into the additional time ensured 2–4 victory for Bengaluru FC. Bengaluru FC created the history by being the first team to win I-League in its debut year. Bengaluru FC ended their campaign on the winning note when they won their final league game 1–2 against Sporting Clube de Goa due to goals from Robin Singh and Beikhokhei Beingaichho in the second half.

Matches

Table

Results summary

Results by round

Celebrations
Bengaluru FC celebrated the victory organizing a parade with players and fans in the city, where the coach and the captain hailed fans as the important part of their campaign.

Federation Cup

On 29 August 2013 the groups for the 2013 Indian Federation Cup were announced by the All India Football Federation. Bengaluru FC were placed in Group B along with East Bengal, Rangdajied United, and Sporting Goa.

Bengaluru FC began their Federation Cup campaign on 15 January 2014 against Sporting Goa at the Malappuram District Sports Complex Stadium. The club could not have kicked off their campaign any brighter after they took a 4–0 lead through a double from Beikhokhei Beingaichho and goals from Sunil Chhetri and Robin Singh. Sporting Goa however then managed to pull three back from goals by Boima Karpeh, Beevan D'Mello, and Victorino Fernandes. Bengaluru FC though managed to see out the match by scoring a fifth and final goal from Robin Singh to win the match 5–3. Bengaluru FC then began their second match against Rangdajied United in the best possible way with a 2nd-minute goal from Thoi Singh before Rangdajied United equalized in the 80th minute from Lamine Tamba to end the game 1–1.

The club's campaign in the tournament then finally came to an end three days later when a brace from Chidi Edeh saw Bengaluru FC lose 2–0 to East Bengal, the third time this entire season Bengaluru FC lost to East Bengal 2–0.

Table
Group B

Accolades
Bengaluru FC received numerous accolades in the season. Sunil Chhetri was the joint top-scorer in 2013–14 I-League along with Cornell Glen and Daryl Duffy. He also received All India Football Federation's player of the year award. In AIFF's annual awards, Sunil Chhetri was awarded the best player and the best forward of I-League, while John Johnson was awarded the best defender award. Ashley Westwood was named coach of the year by FPAI. Six Bengaluru FC players including Rino Anto, John Johnson, Beikhokhei Beingaichho, Siam Hanghal, Johnny Menyongar and Sunil Chhetri were selected as part of Sportskeeda's "Team of the year". Chhetri was also declared AIFF player of the year for 2014.

Player information

Squad information

Season signings

Loan in

Management

As of January 2014.

Player statistics

Appearances and goals

Updated: 28 April 2014

Top scorers

Updated: 28 April 2014 source

International Caps
Players called for senior international duty during the 2013–14 season while under contract with Bengaluru FC.

See also
 2013–14 in Indian football
 Bengaluru FC

References

Beng
Bengaluru FC seasons
2010s in Bangalore